The 2016–17 Liga II was the 77th season of the Liga II, the second tier of the Romanian football league system. The season began on 6 August 2016.

A total of 20 teams contested the league. It was the first Liga II season with a single series. The season was played in a round-robin tournament. The first two teams promoted to Liga I at the end of the season and the third-placed team played a play-off match against the 12th-placed team from Liga I. The last five teams relegated to Liga III.

Team changes

To Liga II
Promoted from Liga III
 Sepsi OSK
 Juventus București
 Afumați
 ASU Politehnica Timișoara
 Luceafărul Oradea
Relegated from Liga I
  —

From Liga II
Relegated to Liga III
 Gloria Buzău
 Universitatea Cluj
 Bucovina Pojorâta
 Ceahlăul Piatra Neamț
 Oțelul Galați
 Bihor Oradea
 Dorohoi
 Caransebeș
Promoted to Liga I
 Gaz Metan Mediaș

Excluded teams
After the end of the last season, Petrolul Ploiești was dissolved.

On 21 July 2016 Rapid București was excluded from Liga I after the club went into dissolution. Their place was taken by Poli Timișoara.

Farul Constanța withdrew from Liga II due to financial difficulties and enrolled in Liga III.

SC Bacău withdrew from Liga II due to financial difficulties and enrolled in Liga III.

Baia Mare withdrew from the championship due to financial difficulties.

Teams spared from relegation
Foresta Suceava, Unirea Tărlungeni and Metalul Reșița were spared from relegation due to lack of teams.

Renamed teams
Rapid CFR Suceava was renamed as Foresta Suceava.

Moved teams
ACS Berceni moved from Berceni to Buftea.

Unirea Tărlungeni was moved from Tărlungeni to Ștefăneștii de Jos and took all the players and the staff of CS Ștefănești which was dissolved.

Metalul Reșița was moved from Reșița to Snagov and took all the players and the staff of Voința Snagov which was dissolved.

Șoimii Pâncota was moved from Pâncota  to Șiria.

Stadiums by capacity

Stadiums by locations

Personnel and kits 

Note: Flags indicate national team as has been defined under FIFA eligibility rules. Players and Managers may hold more than one non-FIFA nationality.

Managerial changes

League table

Season results

Liga I play-off
The 12th-placed team of the Liga I faced the 3rd-placed team of the Liga II.

Notes:
 ACS Poli Timișoara qualified for 2017–18 Liga I and UTA Arad qualified for 2017–18 Liga II.

Season statistics

Top scorers
Updated to matches played on 3 June 2017.

Clean sheets
Updated to matches played on 3 June 2017.

*Only goalkeepers who played all 90 minutes of a match are taken into consideration.

Attendances

References

2016-17
Rom
2